Discovery is the eighth studio album by English rock band Electric Light Orchestra (ELO). It was released on 1 June 1979 in the United Kingdom by Jet Records, where it topped record charts, and on 8 June in the United States on Jet through Columbia Records distribution. A music video album featuring all the songs being played by the band was then released on VHS in 1979, then re-released as part of the Out of the Blue: Live at Wembley DVD and VHS in 1998.

Background
Discovery was the band's first number 1 album in the UK, entering the chart at that position and staying there for five weeks. The album contained five hit songs in "Shine a Little Love", "Don't Bring Me Down", "Last Train to London", "Confusion" and "The Diary of Horace Wimp", many of which were heavily influenced by disco (in fact, Richard Tandy nicknamed the album, Disco Very). "Don't Bring Me Down" would become one of their only two top three hits in the UK throughout their career ("Xanadu" would be number one in 1980), and also their highest-charting US single at number 4. "The Diary of Horace Wimp" was also a hit single in the UK, not patterned after the disco sound; instead it was closer in its Beatlesque style to the band's earlier hit "Mr. Blue Sky". The album itself was the first ever to generate four top-ten singles (one of which was a Double A-side) from a single LP in the UK and was eventually certified 2× platinum by the RIAA in 1997.

Discovery is notable in that it was the first ELO album not to feature their resident string trio of Mik Kaminski, Hugh McDowell and Melvyn Gale, although they did make an appearance on the Discovery music videos.

In one of his earliest jobs, comedian/actor Brad Garrett, dressed in Middle Eastern clothes and turban, appears on the back cover as the menacing palace guard who is drawing his scimitar.

Discovery was remastered as part of the Epic/Legacy remaster series in 2001; among the included bonus tracks was a cover of a Del Shannon classic, "Little Town Flirt", which was started during sessions for the album but never finished until the year the album was reissued.

Track listing
All tracks composed by Jeff Lynne, except "Little Town Flirt" written by Maron McKenzie and Del Shannon.

Notes
Bonus tracks were previously unreleased. Track 12 was started 1979, finished 2001. Engineered by Mack and Ryan Ulyate.
Vinyl mastered by Stan "The Man" Ricker.

Personnel
Jeff Lynne – lead vocals, guitars (electric, acoustic 12-string), vocoder, backing vocals, orchestral & choral arrangements, producer
Bev Bevan – drums, percussion, backing vocals
Richard Tandy – piano, synthesizer, Wurlitzer electric piano, clavinet, lead guitar (track 6), backing vocals, orchestral & choral arrangements
Kelly Groucutt – bass guitar, backing vocals, lead vocals

Additional personnel
Louis Clark - orchestral & choral arrangements, orchestra conductor
Mack - engineer

Additional personnel on the music videos
Mik Kaminski – violin
Hugh McDowell – cello
Melvyn Gale – cello

Charts

Weekly charts

Year-end charts

Certifications and sales

Bibliography
The Electric Light Orchestra Story (1980)

References

External links
Jeff Lynne Song Database

1979 albums
Electric Light Orchestra albums
Albums produced by Jeff Lynne
Columbia Records albums
Epic Records albums
Jet Records albums
Disco albums by English artists